Eopriapulites is an early taxon in the priapulid total group, known from orsten-type material at the Kuanchuanpu Formation of China.

References

Further reading 
 
 

Priapulida
Prehistoric protostome genera
Cambrian China
Fossils of China
Fossil taxa described in 2014